Tang-e Shuhan or Tang-e Showhan, also known as Tang-i-Shuwan, may refer to:
 Tang-e Shuhan-e Olya
 Tang-e Shuhan-e Sofla